Colm Ó Cíosóig (born 31 October 1964) is an Irish musician, best known as the drummer for the alternative rock band My Bloody Valentine, of which he was a founding member.

Biography

My Bloody Valentine
Originally formed in 1983, My Bloody Valentine had gone through a few lineup changes before they forged a signature sound that was to become known by the music press as "shoegazing" in the late 80s and early 90s.

Along with Kevin Shields' guitar work and Bilinda Butcher's ethereal vocals, Ó Cíosóig's energetic and snare-heavy drumming had become a key element of the band's sound. He has co-written songs for My Bloody Valentine and has contributed production work to many of their releases.

During the recording of Loveless (1991), Ó Cíosóig suffered from physical ailments that limited his drumming ability. As a result, he played what drum patterns he was able to perform, and the results were sampled and re-arranged for the album. He played live drums for a single song, "Only Shallow". "Touched" was performed solely by Ó Cíosóig without any contribution from the other members of the band.

During My Bloody Valentine's hiatus from the early 1990s onward, he had been prolific with various musical collaborations and guest appearances.

As of November 2007, he has reassumed his role in My Bloody Valentine along with members Kevin Shields, Debbie Googe, and Bilinda Butcher.

Hope Sandoval & the Warm Inventions
Ó Cíosóig's best known work outside My Bloody Valentine is with Hope Sandoval & the Warm Inventions. He had co-written, produced and played several instruments on their 2001 album Bavarian Fruit Bread.  The band's second album Through the Devil Softly was released on 29 September 2009. He also toured with Sandoval's band Mazzy Star in 2012.

Other projects
In 1994, Ó Cíosóig produced and contributed "sampled keyboards" to Wreckage, the fifth album by Dublin-based artist/musician Stano.  In 1997, he was a guest musician on Fire in a Dream Cage by L.  Both albums were released on Hue Records.  Ó Cíosóig was credited with "Digital Editing" on Laika's 1995 debut "Silver Apples of the Moon"

He formed the short-lived band Clear Spot with Stereolab bassist Simon Johns. They had released a 7" vinyl single Moonman Bop on Duophonic Records in 1998.

In 2004, Ó Cíosóig was a guest drummer on Vetiver's self-titled album.  In 2005, he, along with Shields and Sandoval, contributed to Le Volume Courbe's debut album, and he was a guest musician on Film School's 2007 release Hideout.

In 2013, he joined Mr. Shineywater & evolved Rock-N-Roll with Library Of Sands title "Wavy Heat" Top 6 2013 U.K.'s UnCut Magazine, making the U.S. loudest Export Recording Art, after My Bloody Valentine was named the globe's "loudest live music" in 2009.

Ó Cíosóig also recorded songs for The Tigerbeat, a San Francisco-based band that features his sister Fionnuala.

References

1964 births
Living people
Irish rock drummers
Musicians from County Dublin
My Bloody Valentine (band) members
Shoegaze musicians
Irish record producers
20th-century drummers
21st-century drummers
20th-century Irish people
21st-century Irish people
Mazzy Star members
People from Glenageary
The Complex (band) members